John Harriman (1760–1831) was an English cleric and botanist.

Life
Harriman was born at Maryport, Cumberland, into a family of German background named Hermann. became a medical student at 17; but after two years returned to classical studies, and then took holy orders. He became curate of Bassenthwaite in 1787. He moved on to Barnard Castle, Egglestone, and Gainford in County Durham, Long Horseley in Northumberland, Heighington and Croxdale, and lastly to the perpetual curacy of Satley, Durham. 

Harriman concentrated on the botany of Teesdale. He published nothing, but maintained a  correspondence with other botanists. He was knowledgeable about lichens and discovered species. He furnished plants for James Edward Smith's English Botany such as Bartsia alpina, which he had gathered in Teesdale. He was the first botanist to find Gentiana verna in England, and other rare plants in Westmorland and Cumberland. He sent a significant collection of lichens from Egglestone to Smith. He was a fellow of the Linnaean Society, and after his death, on 3 December 1831, at Croft in York, Smith, as president, called the microscopic dot lichen lichen Harrimanni.' Also Verrucaria harrimanii carries his name, given by Erik Acharius.

Notes

 
Attribution
 

1760 births
1831 deaths
18th-century English Anglican priests
19th-century English Anglican priests
18th-century British botanists
People from Maryport
19th-century British botanists